Wilstermarsch is an Amt ("collective municipality") in the county of Steinburg, in Schleswig-Holstein, Germany. It is situated around Wilster, which is the seat of the Amt, but not part of it.

It is the lowest point in Germany, 3.5 meters below sea level.

The Amt Wilstermarsch consists of the following municipalities:

References

Ämter in Schleswig-Holstein